Jules Gilliéron (21 December 1854 – 26 April 1926) was a Swiss-French linguist and dialectologist. From 1883 until his death, he taught dialectology at the École pratique des hautes études in Paris. In 1887, he co-founded the Revue des patois gallo-romans (Journal of Gallo-Romance dialects), which was published until 1893. His most notable work was the monumental Atlas Linguistique de la France (Linguistic Atlas of France), published between 1902 and 1910.

Selected works
 La Faillite de l'étymologie phonétique: résumé de conférences faites à l'École pratique des hautes études (1919), Neuveville: Beerstecher.
 Atlas Linguistique de la France (1902–1910) (with Edmond Edmont), Paris: E. Champion.
 Pathologie et thérapeutique verbales (1921), Paris: E. Champion.
 Les étymologies des étymologistes et celles du peuple (1922), Paris: E. Champion.
 Ménagiana du XXe siècle (1922), Paris: E. Champion.
 Thaumaturgie linguistique (1923), Paris: E. Champion.

References

Linguists
Swiss-French people
1854 births
1926 deaths
École Nationale des Chartes alumni